Adrian Tantari (born 15 March 1961) is an Australian politician, a member of the Labor Party, and was elected as the representative of Hervey Bay, Queensland, during the 2020 Queensland state election. The seat of Hervey Bay has had two Australian Labor Party, a One Nation Party and a National Party/Liberal National Party members since its inception. At the 2020 election, the seat was considered a "safe" seat for the Liberal National Party of Queensland, who had held the seat since 2009.

Biography 
Tantari was born in 1961, in Altona, Victoria, to an Italian family. His father immigrated to Australia after World War Two at the age of 17. Tantari is divorced and has 3 adult children. Prior to the 2020 election, Tantari has lived on the Fraser Coast for over 22 years and was the Labor candidate in the 2017 Queensland state election. Locally, he is a member of the Hervey Bay Historical Society, the Hervey Bay Boat Club, and the Fraser Coast Bicycle Users Group.

Political career

2017 state election 
In 2017, Tantari was the Labor Party candidate for Hervey Bay. He received 29.1% of the vote, behind the Liberal National candidate, Ted Sorensen, who received 37.7% of the vote. After preferences, Tantari received 40.9% of the vote to Sorensen's 59.1%.

Tantari's 2017 campaign emphasised growing the region's educational institutions and gaining better infrastructure for the growing city.

2020 state election 
In his 2020 campaign, Tantari called for the re-establishment of the Ministerial Regional Community Forum, based out of Hervey Bay, to help bolster the economic significance of the region.

Prior to the 2020 Queensland state election, the seat of Hervey Bay was treated as a "safe" seat for the Liberal Nationals. In the final result, Tantari gained over an 11% swing, securing the seat for Labor.

Parliamentary Activities 
Tantari is a member of the Queensland Parliament's Economics and Governance Committee.

Former member of the Queensland Parliament's Parliamentary Crime and Conduct  Committee

References

External links 
 Official profile on the Labor Party website

1961 births
Living people
Australian politicians of Italian descent
Politicians from Queensland
Members of the Queensland Legislative Assembly
Australian Labor Party members of the Parliament of Queensland
21st-century Australian politicians
Labor Right politicians
People from Altona, Victoria